Luunja Parish is a rural municipality in Tartu County, Estonia.

Settlements
Small borough
Luunja
Villages
Kabina - Kakumetsa - Kavastu - Kikaste - Kõivu - Lohkva - Muri - Pajukurmu - Pilka - Poksi - Põvvatu - Rõõmu - Sääsekõrva - Sääsküla - Sava - Savikoja - Sirgu - Sirgumetsa - Veibri - Viira

Religion

Notable people
 (1872–1964), piano maker, founder of the Estonia Piano Factory; was born in Luunja Parish
Jaan Jaago (1887–1949), wrestler; was born in Luunja Parish
Karl Eduard Sööt (1862–1950), poet; was born in Lohkva
Eduard Sõrmus (1878–1940), violinist; was born in Luunja

Gallery

Twinnings
 Jämsänkoski, Finland

See also
JK Luunja

References

External links